Arielle Noa Charnas (born June 13, 1987) (nee Nachmani) is an American fashion blogger and influencer. She is known for a series of controversies during the COVID-19 pandemic  and for the subsequent backlash from brand partners of her blog and Instagram account Something Navy, launched in 2009. Charnas also designed a line of apparel in partnership with Nordstrom.

Early life
Charnas was raised in Old Westbury, New York, on Long Island to a Jewish family.

Career 
In 2009, Charnas began posting photos of her outfits and showcasing her personal style online on a blog started, named Something Navy. She describes her personal style as "elevated basic".

Before her blog gained in popularity, Charnas worked at a Theory store in the Meatpacking District. She later signed a four-year endorsement deal with TRESemmé and appeared in television ads for the shampoo brand that began airing in January 2016.

Charnas later launched her first collection of apparel with Nordstrom in fall 2017. Her first fashion line named Something Navy X Treasure & Bond was launched on September 25, 2017, in 52 Nordstrom stores across the United States and Canada. The collection included 30 ready-to-wear outfits, including shoes and accessories. Sales online exceeded over a million dollars in the first 24 hours.

By September 2017, she had over one million followers on Instagram. In February 2018, Charnas signed a long-term contract with Nordstrom to license Something Navy and her likeness, as well as establish a stand-alone brand. In March 2018, a single Instagram story promoting Bandier, an activewear retailer in which Charnas owns a small stake, generated more than $207,000 in sales in just four hours. In September 2018, Something Navy released Charnas' second collection of apparel with Nordstrom, and the first under the standalone brand. On the launch date, high traffic temporarily shut down the Nordstrom website an hour after the collection's release, but sales for the day reached $4 to $5 million. In August 2019, it was announced that Charnas raised $10 million in funding from investors, valuing the Something Navy brand at nearly $45 million.

On April 2, 2020, Nordstrom further disassociated themselves with her brand due to her actions related to the COVID-19 pandemic. They stated: "Our partnership with Arielle Charnas ended in 2019, and we have no foreseeable collaborations".

Charnas then launched her own brand in July 2020 and Forbes has been projected  Something Navy to grow by 300 times in 2021.

Personal life 
Charnas married Brandon Charnas, a lawyer and real estate advisor with degrees from the University of Pennsylvania and Benjamin N. Cardozo School of Law at Yeshiva University, on October 18, 2014, in Fisher Island, Florida. The couple has three daughters, Ruby Lou, Esme Rae, and Navy Bea.

In March 2020, Charnas announced she had tested positive for COVID-19. She received criticism for using personal connections to receive a COVID-19 test at a time when tests were limited and her symptoms were not severe enough to warrant one. She also received backlash for leaving New York City eight days after her diagnosis to go to the Hamptons, despite stay-at-home orders in place.

References 

American fashion designers
American Internet celebrities
American women bloggers
American bloggers
Fashion influencers
Living people
People from Nassau County, New York
American women fashion designers
21st-century American women
1987 births